Vezhambal is a 1977 Indian Malayalam film, directed by Stanley Jose. The film stars Vincent, M. G. Soman, Sridevi and Ratheesh in the lead roles. The film has musical score by M. K. Arjunan.

Cast
 
Vincent 
M. G. Soman 
Ratheesh 
Sridevi 
Jagathy Sreekumar 
Kaviyoor Ponnamma 
Jose Prakash 
Manavalan Joseph 
Sankaradi 
Aroor Sathyan 
Baby Sheela
Baby Supriya
Bahadoor 
Kottarakkara Sreedharan Nair 
Mallika Sukumaran 
Master Raghu 
Meena 
P. K. Abraham 
Pankajavalli 
Paravoor Bharathan 
Reena

Soundtrack
The music was composed by M. K. Arjunan.

References

External links
 

1977 films
1970s Malayalam-language films